The Yawhg is a role-playing adventure game created by Damian Sommer and Emily Carroll. The game was released for Windows in May 2013.

Gameplay
The Yawhg is a one- to four-player choose-your-own-adventure game that randomizes the story every time it is played. Players must decide how they will spend their time over the course of six weeks leading up to a supernatural storm. The players’ actions will decide the fate of the post-storm community.

Development and release
The Yawhg was originally developed when Damian Sommer and Emily Carroll were paired up for TIFF Nexus’ Comics vs. Games showcase. After being received well at the showcase, the pair decided to release the game online.

Reception
At the 2014 Independent Games Festival, The Yawhg was nominated for awards in the categories "Excellence in Audio" and "Excellence in Narrative". It also received Honourable Mentions for "Excellence in Visual Art" and "Grand Prize".

References

External links
 

2013 video games
Adventure games
Multiplayer and single-player video games
Role-playing video games
Video games developed in Canada
Windows games
Windows-only games